"Road Salt" is a song written by Daniel Gildenlöw, and performed by Pain of Salvation in the first semifinal of Melodifestivalen 2010 in Örnsköldsvik, from where it made it to Andra chansen before getting knocked out of contest. The band also recorded the song on the album Road Salt One.

During Melodifestivalen 2012, the song appeared at "Tredje chansen".

Charts

References 

2010 singles
2010 songs
Pain of Salvation songs
Melodifestivalen songs of 2010
Century Media Records singles
English-language Swedish songs